Thebaud Brothers was an American commission house in New York City. The company was founded c. 1792 by Joseph Thebaud, a French-born agent for the French East India Company. From 1862 until its collapse in 1907, Thebaud Brothers was a leading importer of Henequen fiber from Mexico into the United States.

References 

Defunct companies based in New York City
American companies established in 1792
American companies disestablished in 1907
1792 establishments in New York (state)
1907 disestablishments in New York (state)
Trading companies disestablished in the 20th century
Trading companies established in the 18th century